Xanthacrona is a genus of picture-winged flies in the family Ulidiidae.

Species
 X. bipustulata
 X. phyllochaeta
 X. tripustulata
 X. tuberosa
 X. ypsilon

References

Ulidiidae